Corceiro is a surname.

List of people with the surname 

 David Corceiro (born 1977), French politician
 Margarida Corceiro (born 2002), Portuguese actress

See also 

 Cordeiro

Surnames of French origin
Surnames of Portuguese origin